The following is a list of county roads in Washington County, Florida.  All county roads are maintained by the county in which they reside.

County roads in Washington County

References

FDOT Map of Washington County 
FDOT GIS data, accessed January 2014

 
County